Todd Kent Dunn (born July 29, 1970) is a former Major League Baseball player.

Milwaukee Brewers
In 50 career games, Dunn had 30 hits, three home runs, six doubles, and a .234 batting average. He batted and threw right-handed.

External links

1970 births
Baseball players from Oklahoma
Sportspeople from Tulsa, Oklahoma
Milwaukee Brewers players
North Florida Ospreys baseball players
Living people
Helena Brewers players
Beloit Brewers players
Stockton Ports players
El Paso Diablos players
Tucson Toros players
Louisville Redbirds players
Altoona Curve players
Louisville RiverBats players
Rochester Red Wings players
Norfolk Tides players
Baseball players from Jacksonville, Florida
Bishop Kenny High School alumni